Smee is a character in J. M. Barrie's Peter Pan novels.

Smee may also refer to:

Alfred Smee (1818–1877), English surgeon, chemist, metallurgist and inventor
Smee cell
Anthony Smee (born 1949), English theatre producer and actor
Phil Smee (Philip Lloyd-Smee), English music journalist and album cover designer
Raymond Smee (born 1930), Australian water polo player
Roger Smee (born 1948), English footballer 
Sebastian Smee, Australian arts critic 
Mesoamerican Society for Ecological Economics (SMEE), a regional chapter of the International Society for Ecological Economics

See also
Shmee (disambiguation)
Smew, a species of duck